The Lawhorn Kee Bird is a high-wing, conventional landing gear homebuilt aircraft designed for bush flying.

Design and development
The Kee Bird is the second design from Jerry Lawhorn. It was designed as a low-cost hunting, camping and fishing transport in high-altitude rough landing strips.

The key feature of the aircraft are the oversized  tires for tundra operations. The fuselage is of steel tube construction with doped aircraft fabric covering with round porthole windows. It features upward opening doors, removable seats and overhead mounted wheel controls. The windscreen uses 1/8" safety glass. The aluminium wings were sourced from a Boeing YL-15.

Aircraft construction started in September 1954 and completed in July 1957.

Specifications (Lawhorn Kee Bird)

References

Homebuilt aircraft